also known as  is a fictional character appearing in the manga and anime series One Piece, created by manga artist Eiichiro Oda. she is the captain of the Kuja Pirates and was the only female member Seven Warlords of the Sea prior to the organization's disbandment.

Concept and creation 
The character of Boa Hancock was created by manga artist Eiichiro Oda, the author of the manga series One Piece, and she made her first appearance in its 516th chapter, titled "Pirate Empress Boa Hancock", which was first published in Shueisha's Weekly Shōnen Jump magazine on  September 29, 2008.

Appearances

In One Piece 
Boa Hancock is a member of the all-female Kuja Tribe from the island of Amazon Lily. Sold to the Celestial Dragons during childhood, she and her sisters are force-fed devil fruits and branded as slaves. Eventually freed by Fisher Tiger, the three return to their people. Hancock becomes ruler and is referred to by her subjects as "Snake Princess". Leading the Kuja Pirates, she quickly gains infamy as the "Pirate Empress" and is offered membership in the Seven Warlords of the Sea. Despite resenting the World Government for her past enslavement, which she keeps a secret even from her kinswomen, Hancock accepts the position to protect her people. But when called upon to participate in the Government's war against the Whitebeard Pirates, she initially refuses and only reconsiders after falling in love with Luffy, who enlists her help to infiltrate Impel Down. Hancock is capable of utilizing Haki, including the Color of the Supreme King. The ability of the Paramecia-type Love-Love Fruit allows her to turn anyone charmed by her into stone and back again. She is also often accompanied by her pet snake , who also supports her in battles. After the most recent Levely, the Seven Warlords were disbanded, making her an enemy of the World Government again. A few weeks after her home was invaded by the Marines and the Blackbeard Pirates, she has decided to leave her home to protect her people and reunite with Luffy.

In other media 
In the anime television series adaptation of One Piece, Hancock's voice actress is Kotono Mitsuishi. In the Funimation English adaptation, her voice is supplied by Lydia Mackay. Hancock is a major playable character in the Weekly Shōnen Jumps crossover fighting games J-Stars Victory VS and Jump Force.

Powers and abilities

Devil Fruit 
Hancock ate the Mero Mero no Mi, a Paramecia-type Devil Fruit that allows her petrify people into stone statues, so long as they feel attraction for her. She can completely turn people to stone by hitting them with any of a variety of heart-shaped long-range attacks, as well as partially transform them by striking them physically, only petrifying the area she struck. Thanks to Hancocks unparalleled beauty and charm, very few people (male and female alike) can resist her powers, allowing her to petrify whole crews with no difficulties. Even extremely powerful people are vulnerable to her power if they find Hancock attractive. She can also return her victims to normal if she chooses by blowing a kiss. Only she can undo the effects of her power, if she dies, the next user of the Mero Mero no Mi would not be able to free her victims. A would-be victim is immune to Hancock's power if they block out their "dirty thoughts", such as by feeling strong fear or pain, or if they are simply not attracted to her, such as a blind man not knowing how beautiful she is.

Haki 
She is proficient in both Armament Haki, and Observation Haki, as well as one of the few known characters who possess Conqueror's Haki.

Reception

Popularity 
Hancock's popularity has made her a frequent subject of cosplay, causing a trend among female fans of the series in which they attempt to replicate her iconic look.

Critical response 
Sean Cubillas of Comic Book Resources stated that Hancock is one of the strongest pirates in One Piece.

References

External links 

 Boa Hancock's bio at One Pieces official website 

Female characters in anime and manga
Fictional emperors and empresses
Fictional female pirates
Fictional slaves
Fictional warlords
One Piece characters
Fictional characters with post-traumatic stress disorder
Orphan characters in anime and manga
Anime and manga characters who can move at superhuman speeds
Anime and manga characters with superhuman strength
Martial artist characters in anime and manga
Fictional sea pirates
Comics characters introduced in 2008